The First Christian Church is a historic Disciples of Christ church located at 101 North Tenth Street in Columbia, Missouri.  It was designed by T.N. Bell of Chicago, Illinois and built in 1893.  It has a Richardsonian Romanesque style Sanctuary that includes a square bell tower, horizontal massing with contrasting high gables, round arches, heavy and highly textured stone work, and voussoir arches.  The Education Building was designed by Eugene Groves and added in 1929.  This is the second church building to stand at this site.  The building is still a functioning church today.

It was added to the National Register of Historic Places in 1991. It is located in the North Village Arts District.

References

Bibliography

Churches on the National Register of Historic Places in Missouri
Neoclassical architecture in Missouri
Richardsonian Romanesque architecture in Missouri
Churches completed in 1893
19th-century churches in the United States
Churches in Columbia, Missouri
National Register of Historic Places in Boone County, Missouri
Neoclassical church buildings in the United States